Machhargawan is a panchayat in Bettiah, West Champaran district in Bihar, India. The pin code of Machhargawan is 845452. The area of Machhargawan lies in the district of Bettiah and has a Branch Post Office. Machhargawan officially lies in the postal division of West Champaran, postal region of Muzaffarpur and postal circle of Bihar.

The 4 main villages in Machhargawan panchayat are:

Dhonrhwalia
Matkota
Belbanawa
Macharagawan
Navgawan

Machhargawan Bazaar is the main shopping center for the adjoining villages of the Jogapatti block.

References 

West Champaran district